The genus Sciurus  contains most of the common, bushy-tailed squirrels in North America, Europe, temperate Asia, Central America and South America.

Species
The number of species in the genus is subject to change.
In 2005, Thorington & Hoffman- whose taxonomic interpretation is followed by the IUCN website- accepted 28 species in the genus:

Genus Sciurus 

Subgenus Sciurus
Allen's squirrel, Sciurus alleni
Arizona gray squirrel, Sciurus arizonensis
Mexican gray squirrel, Sciurus aureogaster
Eastern gray squirrel, Sciurus carolinensis
Collie's squirrel, Sciurus colliaei
Deppe's squirrel, Sciurus deppei
Japanese squirrel, Sciurus lis
Calabrian black squirrel, Sciurus meridionalis
Mexican fox squirrel, Sciurus nayaritensis
Fox squirrel, Sciurus niger
Peters's squirrel, Sciurus oculatus
Variegated squirrel, Sciurus variegatoides
Eurasian red squirrel, Sciurus vulgaris
Yucatan squirrel, Sciurus yucatanensis
Subgenus Otosciurus
Abert's squirrel, Sciurus aberti
Subgenus Guerlinguetus
Brazilian squirrel (Guianan squirrel), Sciurus aestuans
Yellow-throated squirrel, Sciurus gilvigularis
Red-tailed squirrel, Sciurus granatensis
Bolivian squirrel, Sciurus ignitus
Ingram's squirrel, Sciurus ingrami
Andean squirrel, Sciurus pucheranii
Richmond's squirrel, Sciurus richmondi
Sanborn's squirrel, Sciurus sanborni
Guayaquil squirrel, Sciurus stramineus
Subgenus Tenes
Persian squirrel, Sciurus anomalus
Subgenus Hadrosciurus
Fiery squirrel, Sciurus flammifer
Junín red squirrel, Sciurus pyrrhinus
Subgenus Hesperosciurus
Western gray squirrel, Sciurus griseus
Subgenus Urosciurus
Northern Amazon red squirrel, Sciurus igniventris
Southern Amazon red squirrel, Sciurus spadiceus

In 2015, 15–17 species were left in the genus Sciurus after de Vivo & Carmignotto comprehensively reviewed South American Sciuridae for the first time in many decades and proposed numerous changes; synonymising some species and many subspecies, splitting another species, and naming new species. They followed Joel Asaph Allen's unsatisfying 1914 attempt in splitting the genus Sciurus by raising the South American subgenera to the rank of genus, adding Urosciurus to Hadrosciurus, and splitting the genus Guerlinguetus in three. Their taxonomic treatment might also require Sciurus deppei to be moved to Notosciurus.

A 2020 paper published on the taxonomy of Sciurinae split Sciurus into multiple new genera and elevated several subgenera. The paper included genetic sampling from almost all recognized species and recommends the following species assignments:
Sciurus
Persian squirrel, S. anomalus
Eurasian red squirrel, S. vulgaris
Japanese squirrel, S. lis
Hesperosciurus
Abert's squirrel, H. aberti
Western gray squirrel, H. griseus
Parasciurus
Allen's squirrel, P. alleni
Arizona gray squirrel, P. arizonensis
Mexican fox squirrel, P. nayaritensis
Fox squirrel, P. niger
Peters's squirrel, P. oculatus
Neosciurus
Eastern gray squirrel, N. carolinensis
Echinosciurus
Mexican gray squirrel, E. aureogaster
Collie's squirrel, E. colliaei
Deppe's squirrel, E. deppei
Variegated squirrel, E. variegatoides
Yucatan squirrel, E. yucatanensis
Simosciurus
S. nebouxii
Guayaquil squirrel, S. stramineus
Guerlinguetus
Brazilian squirrel, G. aestuans
G. brasiliensis
Hadrosciurus
Bolivian squirrel, H. ignitus
Northern Amazon red squirrel, H. igniventris
Junín red squirrel, H. pyrrhinus
Southern Amazon red squirrel, H. spadiceus

Additionally, the paper suggests moving Andean squirrel back to subtribe Microsciurina, the dwarf squirrels, and assigns it to the newly described genus Leptosciurus. The paper's findings agree with prior assessments to synonymize Richmond's squirrel into Red-tailed squirrel and reassigns the Red-tailed squirrel into the previously monotypic Asian genus Syntheosciurus, also in Microsciurina. The paper did not include genetic sampling or taxonomic suggestions for gilvigularis, meridionalis, sanborni, or flammifer.

References

Nowak, Ronald M. 1999. Walker's Mammals of the World, 6th edition. Johns Hopkins University Press, 1936 pp. 
Eisenberg, J.F. 1989. "Mammals of the Neotropics, Volume 1: The Northern Neotropics: Panama, Colombia, Venezuela, Guyana, Suriname, French Guiana". University of Chicago Press.
Redford, K.H. and Eisenberg, J.F. 1992. "Mammals of the Neotropics, Volume 2: The Southern Cone: Chile, Argentina, Uruguay, Paraguay". University of Chicago Press.
Eisenberg, J.F. and Redford, K.H. 1999. "Mammals of the Neotropics, Volume 3: The Central Neotropics: Ecuador, Peru, Bolivia, Brazil". University of Chicago Press.

Footnotes

 
Rodent genera
Extant Miocene first appearances
Taxa named by Carl Linnaeus